"Vlaglied" is a South African patriotic song from the 20th century. It is an ode dedicated to the former South African flag that was used from 1928 to 1994. The song was notably used during the apartheid era as a de facto flag anthem.

History
The lyrics were written by C.J. Langenhoven, who also wrote the lyrics to the former South African national anthem, "Die Stem van Suid-Afrika". It is set to music by F.J. Joubert; it is a simplistic military-style march.

As late as the 1980s, "Vlaglied" was encouraged to be sung at white schools by the apartheid regime of South Africa, in order to help bolster the country's system of apartheid. After apartheid ended in the early 1990s, the song fell out of use by many alongside the flag.

References

South African folk songs